Blanice (German:Blanitz) may refer to various locations in the Czech Republic:

, a river in the South Bohemian Region, tributary of the Otava
Blanice (Sázava), a river in the Central Bohemian Region, tributary of the Sázava
Blanice, a village and administrative part of Bavorov in the South Bohemian Region